The 7th Vietnam Film Festival was held from October 14 to October 20, 1985, in Hanoi, Vietnam, with the slogan: "For the Socialist Fatherland, for the people's happiness, for the development of the national cinema" (Vietnamese: "Vì Tổ quốc xã hội chủ nghĩa, vì hạnh phúc của nhân dân, vì sự phát triển của nền điện ảnh dân tộc").

Event 
The 7th Vietnam Film Festival was held in the context that the country was in the eve of the Renovated Era with many difficulties, but the festival was still organized fairly and warmly.

There are a total of 103 films participating in this film festival. Two feature films "Bao giờ cho đến tháng Mười" and "Xa và gần" were awarded the Golden Lotus along with a number of films in the documentary-science category, but no Golden Lotus for the animated film.

Awards

Feature film

Documentary/Science film

Documentary

Science

Children/Animated film

Notes

References 

Vietnam Film Festival
Vietnam Film Festival
1985 in Vietnam